Robert James Walker, Sr. (February 2, 1929 – February 15, 2016) was a senior sailor in the United States Navy who served as the third Master Chief Petty Officer of the Navy. He was born in Baldwin, New York, and attended grammar and high school in Oxford, New York.

Naval career

Enlisting in the United States Navy in 1948, Walker received his recruit training at the Naval Training Center, Great Lakes, Illinois, where he was cited as company honorman. He then attended Radarman "A" School in Boston, Massachusetts and was assigned to the destroyer . While aboard the Erben, he deployed to the Western Pacific in support of the Korean War. In October 1955, Walker reported to Norfolk, Virginia, as instructor at Radarman "A" School. In June 1956, after just eight years of active service, he was promoted to chief petty officer, which was at the time the highest enlisted rank in the navy.

Homeported in Davisville, Rhode Island, the Guardian was a converted World War II liberty ship being used for radar surveillance. During this tour, Walker was advanced to the newly created rank of senior chief petty officer in 1961 and at the relatively young age of 34, reached the pinnacle of the enlisted ranks and was promoted to master chief on November 16, 1963.

Walker began his second tour of shore duty in 1964 as Director of Training, Radarman “A” School, Great Lakes, Illinois. Three years later, he reported aboard the destroyer  at Newport, Rhode Island, where he was assigned various command duties including senior enlisted advisor and leading chief for combat systems training at the Fleet Combat Direction Systems Training Center, Dam Neck, Virginia. For his outstanding performance, he was awarded the Navy Achievement Medal.

In July 1972, Walker reported aboard the aircraft carrier . He acted as leading chief of the Kennedy's Operations Department and later, as master chief petty officer of the command. For his excellent performance in this capacity, he was awarded the Navy Commendation Medal. In October 1972, the Radarman rating was changed to Operations Specialist and Walker automatically converted to the latter at that time. In November 1974, Walker was selected to serve as Master Chief Petty Officer of the Force, Naval Air Force, United States Atlantic Fleet.

On September 26, 1975, Walker was sworn in as the third Master Chief Petty Officer of the Navy (MCPON). Walker was a much more conservative, traditional MCPON than his predecessor, John Whittet.

Advocacy
During his term, Walker often raised the ire of some by identifying directors of Navy programs who were not serving the best interests of the navy (such as a director of the Board of Corrections of Naval Records, and a commander in Pearl Harbor who was separating sailors for being overweight even though he himself was obese) and saw to their quick removal. He was instrumental in creating the Navy's Senior Enlisted Academy, from which virtually all subsequent MCPONs were graduates. He also brought about the Enlisted Surface Warfare Specialist program, to add the same professionalism and thorough platform knowledge within the surface community that had been present for decades in the submarine community.

Walker fought for increases in sea pay, improvements in off-duty education opportunities, consolidation of the three-form system of enlisted evaluation reports into a uniform format, and a return to the traditional "crackerjacks" phased out by ADM Zumwalt. Personnel records were moved to microfiche vice paper to streamline archival, storage and retrieval. They have since been completely computerized. Many of these changes would not take effect until after Walker's MCPON tour ended, but he was the driving force behind their implementation.

Retirement and later life 
Walker retired on September 28, 1979, immediately after the swearing in of his successor, Thomas S. Crow. He remained active following his retirement, serving as President of the Non-Commissioned Officers Association. In 1990, Robert J. Walker Hall, the home of Operations Specialist "A" School at Fleet Combat Training Center Atlantic, Dam Neck, Virginia was named for him. He died February 15, 2016, at the age of 87.

Military awards and decorations

Senior Enlisted Advisor Badge. 
7 gold Service Stripes.

External links

 Extensive bio at quarterdeck.org
 Three Stars and a Crow

References

1929 births
2016 deaths
Master Chief Petty Officers of the United States Navy
People from Baldwin, Chemung County, New York
People from Oxford, New York
United States Navy personnel of the Korean War